Fate for Breakfast is the fourth solo studio album by Art Garfunkel, released in March 1979 on Columbia Records.

It was his first album to miss the U.S. Billboard Top 40 (charting at a dismal 67) and his first album containing no U.S. Top 40 singles. Yet the album garnered international success, reaching the top-ten in some European countries. The European release includes a different version of the song "Bright Eyes", which was featured in the film version of the novel Watership Down, and reached the number-one spot in the United Kingdom, becoming the biggest-selling single of 1979 there.

The album was issued in six different sleeves, each with a different shot of Art Garfunkel at the breakfast table. David Sanborn covered "And I Know" entitled "Love Will Come Someday" for his 1982 album As We Speak.  Also on the album is a cover of Cliff Richard's 1976 hit "Miss You Nights".

Track listing

Personnel
 Art Garfunkel – vocals, harmony vocals
 Penny Nichols, Bobby Alessi, Carolyn Dennis, Leah Kunkel, Jim Gilstrap, Billy Alessi, Maxine Anderson – background vocals
 Stephen Bishop – guitar, background vocals
 Michael Brecker, Tom Scott – tenor saxophone
 Rob Mounsey – synthesizer, piano, clavinet, Fender Rhodes, keyboards
 Chris Spedding – acoustic guitar on "Bright Eyes"
 Gene Page – arranger
 Simon Phillips, Steve Gadd, Roy J. Morgan, Mike Baird – drums
 Louis Shelton – acoustic guitar, backing vocals
 Dennis Belfield, Lyle Harper, Les Hurdle, Neil Jason – bass guitar
 Ray Cooper, Errol "Crusher" Bennett, Alan Estes, Lyle Forman – percussion
 Edwin Roxburgh – oboe
 Roland Harker – lute
 Larry Knechtel – piano
 Del Newman – string arrangement
 Lee Ritenour, Richie Zito, Hugh McCracken – electric guitar
 Larry Rolando – acoustic guitar, electric guitar
 Jeffrey Staton – acoustic guitar, background vocals
 Richard Tee – piano, Fender Rhodes

Charts

Weekly charts

Year-end charts

Certifications

References

1979 albums
Art Garfunkel albums
Columbia Records albums
Albums produced by Mike Batt